Miss Ukraine Universe (or Miss Universe Ukraine / ) is one of the biggest beauty pageants in Ukraine. The winner represents Ukraine at the most prestigious international beauty contest "Miss Universe". 

The pageant exists since 2006, after the Miss Ukraine Organization lost the Miss Universe franchise to Oleksandra Nikolayenko. The winner of the pageant represents Ukraine at the Miss Universe contest. Previously, the representative of Ukraine was chosen by the Miss Ukraine Committee.

The current holder of the Miss Ukraine Universe title is Viktoria Apanasenko from Chernihiv, who received the title on June 15, 2022.

History
The Miss Ukraine Universe pageant was founded in 2006 by Oleksandra Nikolayenko Ruffin. 

Natalie Glebova, Miss Universe 2005 was invited by Oleksandra to visit Ukraine to promote the Miss Ukraine Universe contest in 2006. The first edition of the contest was won by Inna Tsymbalyuk.

In April 2016 Oleksandra Nikolayenko Ruffin sold the pageant. A foreign-owned international company became the new owner of the Miss Ukraine Universe beauty contest. 

The current Miss Universe license holder in Ukraine and the National Director of the Miss Ukraine Universe pageant is Anna Filimonova.

Selection of the winner 
Participants of the pageant should be citizens of Ukraine and have from 18 to 28 years of age.

The jury members of the contest are well-known film and television stars, athletes, entrepreneurs, and philanthropists. The jury and the honored guests of the Miss Ukraine Universe pageant: Naomi Campbell, Dolph Lundgren, Jean-Claude Van Damme, Sylvester Stallone, Jason Statham, Joan Collins, Thomas Anders, Eric Trump, Andrii Shevchenko, Snizhana Onopko, Oleksandr Dolgopolov, Caroline Wozniacki, Paula Shugart, Miss Universe-2008 Dayana Mendoza, Miss Universe-2005 Natalie Glebova, Fadil Berisha, Sherri Hill and others.

Titleholders 

The winner of Miss Ukraine Universe represents her country at the Miss Universe. On occasion, when the winner does not qualify (due to age) for either contest, a runner-up is sent. Before 2006 Miss Ukraine pageant sent delegates to Miss Universe pageant under Lilia Kuznetsova directorship.

Oblast Rankings

See also
Miss Universe
Ukraine at major beauty pageants

References

External links

Official Miss Ukraine Universe website

 
Beauty pageants in Ukraine
Ukraine
Ukrainian awards